Ugia eugrapha is a species of moth in the family Erebidae first described by Charles Swinhoe in 1907. It is found in Indonesia (Bali, Borneo, Java, Sumatra) and Thailand.

References

Moths described in 1907
Ugia
Moths of Indonesia
Moths of Asia
Taxa named by Charles Swinhoe